The 15th Saturn Awards, honoring the best in science fiction, fantasy and horror film in 1987, were held on August 23, 1988.

The nominations were announced on April 7, 1988. The science fiction action film RoboCop won five awards, including Best Science Fiction Film.

Winners and nominees
Below is a complete list of nominees and winners. Winners are highlighted in bold.

Film awards

Special awards

George Pal Memorial Award
 Larry Cohen

Life Career Award
 Roger Corman

President's Award
 Mike Jittlov and Richard Kaye – The Wizard of Speed and Time

Silver Scroll (Outstanding Achievement)
 Gary Goddard – Masters of the Universe

References

External links
 The Official Saturn Awards Site

Saturn
Saturn Awards ceremonies